Pokémon is a Japanese animated television series based on the Pokémon video game series published by Nintendo. The Pokémon anime series debuted in Japan on April 1, 1997 and currently has 1,233 episodes. However, for various reasons, some have been taken out of rotation of reruns in certain countries, while others were altered or completely banned.

Series overview

Episode list

Seasons (1–13) 
 List of Pokémon episodes (seasons 1–13)
 Pokémon: Indigo League
 Pokémon: Adventures in the Orange Islands
 Pokémon: The Johto Journeys
 Pokémon: Johto League Champions
 Pokémon: Master Quest
 Pokémon: Advanced
 Pokémon: Advanced Challenge
 Pokémon: Advanced Battle
 Pokémon: Battle Frontier
 Pokémon the Series: Diamond and Pearl
 Pokémon: Diamond and Pearl: Battle Dimension
 Pokémon: Diamond and Pearl: Galactic Battles
 Pokémon: Diamond and Pearl: Sinnoh League Victors

Seasons (14–present) 
 List of Pokémon episodes (seasons 14–present)
 Pokémon the Series: Black & White
 Pokémon: Black & White: Rival Destinies
 Pokémon: Black & White: Adventures in Unova and Beyond
 Pokémon the Series: XY
 Pokémon the Series: XY Kalos Quest
 Pokémon the Series: XYZ
 Pokémon the Series: Sun & Moon
 Pokémon the Series: Sun & Moon – Ultra Adventures
 Pokémon the Series: Sun & Moon – Ultra Legends
 Pokémon Journeys: The Series
 Pokémon Master Journeys: The Series
 Pokémon Ultimate Journeys: The Series

References

External links

 
episodes
Pokémon

Notes